Gainey is a surname. Notable people with the surname include:

Bob Gainey (born 1956), Canadian ice hockey player
Ed Gainey (Canadian football) (born 1990), American gridiron football player
Edward Gainey (born 1956), American politician
Kathleen M. Gainey, American army general
M. C. Gainey (born 1948), American actor
Steve Gainey (born 1979), Canadian ice hockey player
Tommy Gainey (born 1975), American golfer
Ty Gainey (born 1960), American baseball player
William Gainey (born 1956), American soldier